Chrysoteuchia porcelanellus is a moth in the family Crambidae. It was described by Victor Motschulsky in 1861. It is found in Russia and Japan.

References

Crambini
Moths described in 1861
Moths of Asia
Moths of Japan